Viatronix, Inc. (known as Viatronix) is a creator and researcher of clinical applications software for radiology, focusing on virtual colonoscopy. It is a corporation based in Stony Brook, New York, United States. Beside

Products 
The company is known for products that provide data for work in radiology. Its most widely known product is V3D-Colon, a software system that provides virtual colonoscopy. This is the first commercial available medical image visualization software product with FDA market clearance based on PC platform in the history that made the 3D primary read a reality. Meanwhile, V3D-Explorer is a general 3D package for visualizing and analyzing CT, MR, PET and other images. Beyond virtual colonoscopy, it provides V3D-Vascular, a tool for detecting, visualizing and quantifying vascular structures; V3D-Calcium Scoring, a package used to detect and quantify calcified coronary plaques, a marker of coronary artery disease; and V3D-Cardiac, a software for assisting physician to detecting, visualizing, quantifying coronary and left ventricle structures and functions, diagnosis of heart diseases, and reporting based on Computed Tomography Angiography (CTA) images.

Medical imaging